Cortachy Castle is a castellated mansion House at Cortachy, Angus, Scotland, some four miles north of Kirriemuir. The present building dates from the 15th century, preceded by an earlier structure that was owned by the Earls of Strathearn. It was acquired by the Ogilvies in 1473 and substantively modified in the 17th and 19th centuries. The 1696 remodelling was by Tobias Bauchop of Alloa.

In 1820 it was "romanticised", as was the fashion of the day, by the addition of crenellations, plus other alterations by R & R Dickson. Part of the building was damaged by fire in 1883 and it was extensively rebuilt in the following two years by Kinnear & Peddie.

Cortachy Castle is a Category B listed building and the grounds are included in the Inventory of Gardens and Designed Landscapes in Scotland.

The castle is said to be haunted by the spirit of a drummer.

References

Castles in Angus, Scotland
Reportedly haunted locations in Scotland
Inventory of Gardens and Designed Landscapes